Saalschutz is a Swiss electropop band from Zurich. The band classifies its style as "techno punk".

Band history
After a split single with Knarf Rellöm, released on Rewika Records in 2003, the first album  followed in 2004, released on ZickZack records.  Saalschutz combines electronic dance music with mostly German, sometimes English and seldom French or Swiss German lyrics which often have dadaistic characteristics. It combines the styles of Synthpop, Electropunk and Electroclash – as well as Metal, Garage Rock, Tribal House and Trance – creating a style similar to that of Knarf Rellöm, Räuberhöhle and (in parts) Egotronic. In 2006, the second regular album  was released on ZickZack and Audiolith Records. (meaning "Saalschutz makes it possible") After touring extensively, the band released their third album  in November 2010.

While, compared to bands like Egotronic or Frittenbude, not being explicitly political in their lyrics, Saalschutz supports political initiatives such as I Can't Relax in Deutschland or Rage Against Abschiebung.

Discography

Singles:
2010 ""
2010 ""

Albums:
2004 
2006 
2010 
2013 

Splits:
 2003: Knarf Rellöm & DJ Patex / Saalschutz: Little Big City / Technopunk
 2005: Saalschutz / The Dance Inc.: Never Mind The Remix
 2005: Egotronic / Saalschutz: Luxus
 2006: Saalschutz / Räuberhöhle: Saalschutz loves Räuberhöhle

References

External links
Official Website
The band's blog
MySpace page

Swiss electronic music groups